Robert "Rob" Edamura (born 30 May 1965) is a Canadian retired field hockey player.

Edamura was born in Toronto, Ontario.

International competitions
 1991 Pan American Games, Havana (2nd)
 1995 Pan American Games, Mar del Plata (2nd)
 1996 Men's Hockey Olympic Qualifier, Barcelona (6th)
 1996 World Cup Preliminary, Sardinia (2nd)
 1997 Men's Hockey World Cup Qualifier, Kuala Lumpur (5th)

References

1965 births
Living people
Canadian male field hockey players
Pan American Games silver medalists for Canada
Field hockey players at the 1991 Pan American Games
Field hockey players at the 1995 Pan American Games
Field hockey players from Toronto
Pan American Games medalists in field hockey
Medalists at the 1995 Pan American Games
Medalists at the 1991 Pan American Games